Alice Taylor may refer to:
Alice Taylor (businesswoman), British entrepreneur
Alice Taylor (writer) (born 1938), Irish writer
Alice Bemis Taylor (1877–1942), philanthropist
E. Alice Taylor (1892–1986), African-American entrepreneur, teacher, and community organizer
Alison Uttley (1884–1976), née Alice Jane Taylor, British writer
Alice Taylor, one of the Take the High Road characters